Matt Shumway (born 1978) is an Animation Supervisor known for his works in Life of Pi (2012) and The Revenant (2015)

Matt Shumway was nominated at the 88th Academy Awards for his work on the film The Revenant in the category of Best visual effects. His nomination was shared with Cameron Waldbauer, Richard McBride and Jason Smith.

References

External links

Living people
Special effects people
1978 births
Place of birth missing (living people)